Torney General Hospital was a US Army Hospital in Palm Springs, California, in Riverside County used during World War II. Parts of Torney General Hospital are now the Desert Regional Medical Center.

In November 1945 Torney General Hospital was closed and the Federal Works Administration sold the site. The Torney General Hospital became the Palm Springs Desert Hospital and the Palm Springs Desert Medical Plaza. The hospital is now called the Desert Regional Medical Center.  The El Mirador Tower is still a landmark at the entrance to the hospital.

History

El Mirador Hotel
The El Mirador Hotel opened on December 31, 1927, as 20 acres Desert Resort. The hotel was built by Prescott Thresher Stevens and the Los Angeles architect firm of Walker & Eisen. El Mirador Hotel was busy spot visited by Hollywood stars and the wealthy. At the 1928 opening were: Douglas Fairbanks, Mary Pickford and Lillian Gish. The hotel had an open policy, frequent guests were Marx Brothers, Al Jolson and Albert Einstein.  The hotel had Spanish-Colonial Revival-style bell tower, 200 rooms, tennis courts, Olympic swimming pool, horse stables, and a golf course. El Mirador is Spanish for watchtower.  The 120-acre golf course was California' first desert golf course. Stevens built the hotel at a cost of one million dollars. The good times at the hotel ended with the Wall Street Crash on October 24, 1929. Stevens sold the hotel at loss for $300,000 in 1932. Purchased by bondholders Tony Burke and Frank Bogert, the new owners publicized Palm Springs and the hotel as an international playground. Amos 'n' Andy show was broadcast from the hotel in the early 1930s.

Torney General Hospital
The US Army purchased the El Mirador Hotel in July 1942 and rebuilt the 139 acre complex as a 1600-bed general hospital. A year later, in 1943, the Army transferred the hospital to the Army Air Forces. Torney General Hospital was named after George H. Torney (1850–1913), physician in the United States Navy and Army who served as the 21st Surgeon General of the United States Army. Torney General Hospital was used for general medicine, with specialized care for rheumatic fever, general surgery and orthopedic surgery. The hospital supported the Desert Training Center, other California training camps and troops returning home from overseas. With a shortage of manpower, 250 men with the Italian Service Unit worked at the hospital. A Women's Army Corps Detachment also worked at the hospital. Units stationed at Torney General Hospital during World War II included:
 22 Army Service Forces General Hospital
 737th and 742nd Sanitation Companies (Medical)(Colored)
 1976th Service Command Unit (Station Complement)
 1976th Service Command Unit (Station Complement)
 Italian Service Unit 1967th Service Command Unit from Camp Haan, Prisoner of War Branch Camp near Riverside, California.

In 1951, the National Hotel Enterprises purchased the buildings not used for the Palm Springs Desert Hospital. National Hotel Enterprises modernized the hotel and it opened again on December 13, 1952. In the 1960s it became a Hilton hotel and KMIR-TV NBC opened a studio there. In 1972 Desert Hospital next to the hotel purchased the hotel and expanded the hospital.

Desert Regional Medical Center
Desert Regional Medical Center is a 385-bed General Hospital located at 1150 N. Indian Canyon Drive, Palm Springs. Desert Regional Medical Center opened in 1948 and is currently  operated by Tenet Healthcare. Desert Regional Medical Center has an emergency room and a Level II trauma center that serves the Coachella Valley. Desert Regional Medical Center has General Medicine Care and specialize care for: Digestive Disorders, Heart Care, Lab Services, Minimally Invasive Procedures, Rehabilitation Services, Respiratory, Weight Loss Surgery, Women's Health, Maternity and Neonatal intensive care unit. Desert Regional Medical Center has 300 physicians on staff covering over 40 different specialties. The number of medical offices there are called the Desert Regional Medical Center campus. Desert Regional Medical Center is part of the Desert Care Network that includes: John F. Kennedy Memorial Hospital in Indio, California, Hi-Desert Medical Center in Joshua Tree, California. Desert Care Network also includes: Medpost Urgent Care centers in Indio, La Quinta, California and Palm Desert, California and primary & specialty Care offices in the Coachella Valley.

Present features

Desert Healthcare Park
Desert Healthcare Park also called Wellness Park was built in 1948 on the former Torney General Hospital land. The City of Palm Springs, the Desert Water Agency, and Palm Springs Unified School District have helped to build the park. The park is maintained by the non-profit group, Desert Healthcare Foundation. The five-acre public park at 1140 N. Indian Canyon Drive in Palm Springs has:
 Interactive gardens
 Quarter-mile walking/jogging loop with drinking fountains and benches
 Five exercise/fitness stations
 Gardens
 Meditation spots
 Memorial
 Fragrance garden
 Bubbling fountain
 Butterfly and hummingbird garden

Ruth Hardy Park
The city-owned 22 acre Ruth Hardy Park was built in 1948 on the former Torney General Hospital land. It is located at 700 Tamarisk Road.

El Mirador Tower
The El Mirador Tower is a Moroccan-Spanish style landmark in Palm Springs since the hotel was built in 1927. In the early days the El Mirador Tower had a broadcast radio studio – some Amos 'n' Andy shows were done in the tower. The original tower was destroyed on July 25, 1989, in a fire that started just after midnight. In 1991 a new tower that looks just like the original tower was built.

See also
 List of hospitals in California
 California during World War II

References

External links
 Desert Regional Medical Center
 Desert Care Network

Hospitals in Riverside County, California
Military in Riverside County, California
Installations of the United States Army in California
Closed installations of the United States Army
Closed medical facilities of the United States Army
History of Riverside County, California
United States in World War II
1942 establishments in California